Rangarajan K. "Raghu" Sundaram is an Indian-born American academic. He is the Dean of the New York University Stern School of Business, and the author or co-author of two books.

Early life
Sundaram was educated in India, where he earned a Bachelor's degree from the University of Madras in 1982 and a master in business administration from the Indian Institute of Management Ahmedabad in 1984. He earned a master's degree and a PhD in Economics from Cornell University in 1987 and 1988 respectively.

Career
Sundaram taught economics at the University of Rochester from 1988 to 1996, when he joined the New York University Stern School of Business. He has served as its dean since January 2018. Since 2020, he serves as an academic council member of Krea University, a liberal arts and sciences private university located in Sricity, Andhra Pradesh, India.

Sundaram is the author or co-author of two books, including one about derivatives. He won the Jensen Prize from the Journal of Financial Economics in 2000.

Sundaram has one daughter, Aditi, a student at Harvard University.

Works

See also
 Indians in the New York City metropolitan area
 New York University

References

Living people
University of Madras alumni
Indian Institute of Management Ahmedabad alumni
Cornell University alumni
University of Rochester faculty
New York University Stern School of Business faculty
Business school deans
Year of birth missing (living people)